Haile is a surname of Ethiopian origin . name meaning "power, might." Pronounced: HY-lee.

It is very common surname in Ethiopia and throughout East Africa and diaspora .

It was second most popular surname in Eritrea followed by 13th most common in Ethiopia.

People with the surname include:

Abeba Haile (born 1970), Eritrean singer
Almayahu Haile (died 1977), member of the military junta that ruled Ethiopia during the Ethiopian Revolution
Asrat Haile (fl. 2000s), former manager of the Ethiopia national football team
Berard Haile (1874–1961), Franciscan priest
Chanyalew Haile (born 1949), Ethiopian boxer
Eugen Haile (1873–1933), German-American composer, singer, and accompanist
Ferrell Haile (fl. 2000s–2010s), member of the Tennessee State Senate
Gebremedhin Haile (fl. 2010s), Ethiopian football coach who has managed the Ethiopia national football team
Getatchew Haile (1932–2021), Ethiopian-American philologist
John Haile (died 1535), vicar of Isleworth Middlesex
Joseph Haile, namesake of the Joseph Haile House in Providence, Rhode Island
Levi Haile (died 1854), Justice of the Rhode Island Supreme Court
Margaret Haile (fl. 1900s), Canadian socialist
Minasse Haile (born 1930), Minister of Foreign Affairs of Ethiopia
Mitiku Haile (born 1951) Ethiopian professor of soil science
Sossina M. Haile (born 1966), American chemist
Tadesse Haile (born 1952), Ethiopian boxer
Thomas Evans Haile, namesake of the historic Haile Homestead and Haile Plantation, Florida
William Haile (New Hampshire politician) (1807–1876), Governor of New Hampshire
William H. Haile (1833–1901), Mayor of Springfield, Massachusetts and Lieutenant Governor of Massachusetts
William Haile (Mississippi politician) (1797-1837), U.S. Representative from Mississippi
Yonatan Haile (born 1994), Eritrean cyclist

See also
Haile (disambiguation)
Hale (surname)
Haley (surname)